In considering the Bordeaux Wine Official Classification of 1855, Alexis Lichine held the opinion that the list, some hundred years after the selection was made, no longer expressed the whole truth concerning the ranking of Bordeaux wine. Working for a reevaluation and change of structure of the classification of Bordeaux estates, he ended up spending much of his professional life on a campaign that lasted more than thirty years to accomplish a revision. Having published his Classification des Grands Crus Rouges de Bordeaux in 1962, with several revisions over the following years, Lichine came to be viewed as "the doyen of unofficial classification compilers".

Reclassification
In 1959, a committee of which Lichine was a member as well as leading Bordeaux growers, shippers and brokers, was formed to decide what was to be done about reclassifying the work of 1855. Investigations revealed to what extent parcels of land had exchanged hands, some were considered insignificant but in other cases important transfers of terrain had taken place. It is acknowledged that at the time the list was compiled in great haste, primarily on the basis of which estates had consistently commanded the highest prices. While there was widespread agreement the 1855 classification had flaws, a general view remained that it was impossible to improve upon it.

The committee made a formal request to proceed with the revision in 1960. Opting for three categories instead of five, removing 18 chateaux and adding 13 new ones with updates every five years provoked reactions of outrage among those who faced great loss, "Château owners demoted or entirely deleted… condemned the ranking as malicious, incompetent and unjust." The Institut National des Appellations d'Origine (INAO) was called to arbitrate, but it became decided that the jurisdiction of INAO was too limited to resolve a matter of this complexity. After two years of efforts, the Bordeaux Chamber of Commerce and Académie des Vins de Bordeaux also became involved in the debate surrounding the reforms. Recognising that the process would take a great deal of time, Lichine decided to publish his own classification.

Goals
In agreement with the committee, Lichine believed that, just as the principal philosophy behind the 1855 classification, price would be the most reliable indicator, but a revision could not let the transfer of first-rate soil go unchallenged. It was also important to identify cases where highly classified estates had become surpassed by those rated Fifth Growth or Cru Bourgeois, and addressing the 1855 classification's neglect of properties from other areas than Médoc, namely those of Graves, Saint-Émilion and Pomerol. Attempting to bring these areas together under one classification was considered unique to the Lichine rating.

Lichine also believed that no classification could be planned for a shorter span than 25–50 years since frequent changes would create consumer confusion and loss of public confidence, but saw the 1855 classification as evidence that no ruling can remain valid indefinitely.

Lichine was convinced that rankings of "first", "second", etc. were a mistake that should not be repeated, unfairly implying that there was, for instance, something second-rate about a Second Growth. Choosing to adapt and expand on the ranks used in the classifications of Graves and Saint-Émilion, Lichine arrived at the categories: Outstanding Growths, Exceptional Growths, Great Growths, Superior Growths and Good Growths.

Among the most visible changes was the elevation of Château Mouton Rothschild from its second growth status to Cru Hors Classe, which was the only of his suggestions ever to be realised. Mouton Rothschild was promoted to Premier Cru status in 1973.

Publications
Lichine's classification was published in 1962 and revised in 1966. Later revisions followed until the last version was published in 1985, though the final classification was dated to 1978. Never coming to fruition before Lichine's death, some of the reasons are believed to be the 1855 establishment's political muscle, prosperity and prospects, social status, market clout, professional and personal prestige and conservatism.

Resigned to the fact that no revision would be made, Lichine wrote in 1986, "when one considers the outcry, disputes and lawsuits brought about by a new classification proposed for St.-Emilion in 1985, one must reluctantly conclude that no such new classification - however much needed - is likely to win adoption."

Other published classifications that attempt to revise the 1855 ranking include a top 100 ranking by Robert Parker and L'histoire de la vigne & du vin (English: The History of Wine and the Vine) by Bernard and Henri Enjalbert, efforts by Clive Coates (MW) and David Peppercorn (MW), as well as a 2009 re-calculation by the British wine exchange Liv-ex.

Classification des Grands Crus Rouges de Bordeaux
The final 1978 revision with comparison notes to the 1966 revision.

﹡  Lichine notes, "These wines are considered better than their peers in this classification". 
 a  Promoted a tier placement from 1966 to 1978. 
 b  Relegated a tier placement from 1966 to 1978.

1978 demotions

References

Footnotes

Bordeaux wine
Wine classification